Brevard Zoo is a 75-acre nonprofit facility located in Melbourne, Florida, United States, that is home to more than 900 animals representing more than 195 species from Florida, South America, Africa, Asia, and Australia. The zoo features animal feedings, kayak tours, behind-the-scenes tours, and a train ride, along with the attraction Treetop Trek. The zoo has also featured a dinosaur exhibit several times in its past, including one titled "Dinosaurs are Back", which ran from November 2017 to April 2018. Brevard Zoo is a nonprofit organization accredited by the Association of Zoos and Aquariums.

The zoo is divided into five loops: Expedition Africa, Lands of Change: Australia and Beyond, Wild Florida, Rainforest Revealed, and Paws On. These loops are accessed off of the main loop that encircles the flamingo pond.

History
In 1986, the East Coast Zoological Society of Florida, Inc. (ECZS) formed. One of their goals was to build a zoo for Brevard County to "serve as a conversation hub where people could gather to learn about animals and nature.  A place to escape from the manmade world and reconnect with the diversity of the life with which we share this planet." In 1992, construction of the zoo began, with over 16,000 people coming together to help build the zoo. The Brevard Zoo claims to have had "The World's Largest Volunteer Community Build". Brevard Zoo celebrated its grand opening on March 26, 1994.

A record 328,973 visitors attended in 2007. This included 175,046 paid daily guests. The others included reciprocal members of other zoos, and annual members. The zoo has an annual budget of $5 million most of which is earned and not raised through fundraising or grants.

In 2007, the zoo started renovations on their Paws On exhibit, with it reopening in April 2009.  Renovations included a shallow swimming area and an aquarium. The Contact Yard (petting zoo) was updated and reopened as “The Barnyard”.

In October 2012, one of the southern white rhinos from this zoo was transferred to Alabama's Birmingham Zoo to take part in a breeding program with its two female southern white rhinos.

In 2014, the black-throated monitor died. It was donated to the zoo when it was two years old in 2005.

In 2017, the zoo renovated their Australia and Asia exhibits and reopened them as "Lands of Change: Australia and Beyond".

In 2019, the zoo renovated their La Selva exhibits and reopened then as "Rainforest Revealed".

Park areas

Wildlife Detective Training Academy
The Wildlife Detective Training Academy, or WDTA, was a building focused specifically towards younger children and features terrariums containing many of the zoo's reptiles, amphibians, arthropods, and a few mammals including chinchillas and flying squirrels. It also featured interactive activities, such as a sand pit, where children could dig up bones from an animal "crime scene", and an animal hospital where children could learn about animal anatomy and veterinary science. The WDTA also featured a new mystery every month in which children could investigate and find clues throughout the zoo. The building is located to the right of the main entrance in a separate building. After Paws On reopened in 2009, visitors had to go through Paws On to enter the WDTA. The WDTA did not reopen to the public after the zoo reopened after closing during the 2020 pandemic.

Expedition Africa
Expedition Africa offers kayaking on the grounds of the zoo. Trained staff lead the kayak trips and provide informative dialogue during a slow glide past African-themed exhibits. These exhibits include: Masai giraffes, impalas, Grévy's zebras, white rhinos, scimitar oryxes, dromedary camels, klipspringers, meerkats, a common ostrich, crested guineafowl, West African crowned cranes, southern ground hornbills, marabou storks and African spurred tortoises. The area also includes red ruffed and ring-tailed lemurs and radiated tortoises from Madagascar. After kayaking, visitors can climb up to an observation platform where they can feed the giraffes at eye-level. Siamangs are located in-between the entrances to the Expedition Africa and Lands of Change loops. Cheetahs were added in February 2010. Meerkats were added in 2014.  Two zebra mares were added to the white rhino exhibit on President's Day 2015.  The zoo also has a population of scimitar oryx, a species that has been extinct in the wild since 2000, On February 3, 2017, a new oryx calf was born at the zoo. On December 8, 2020, three two-year-old male Watusi cattle (Maximus, Boss Hogg and Galloping Ghost) arrived at the zoo from a ranch in Oklahoma, and the zoo's first eastern bongo (a five-year-old male named Sebastian from the Naples Zoo), who only has one horn—the other was surgically removed following an injury at a previous facility, came the next day.

Lands of Change: Australia and Beyond
As its name implies, this loop features animals from Australia, Oceania, Southeast Asia and South America. Visitors can find animals such as the red kangaroos, emus, North Sulawesi babirusas, Visayan warty pigs, wrinkled hornbills and black swans. Lands of Change: Australia and Beyond also hosts the free-flight aviary where visitors have the option of feeding rainbow lorikeets. The aviary is home to: galahs, cockatiels, laughing kookaburras, Victoria crowned pigeons and radjah shelducks, among others. It is divided into two sections - the "lorikeet side" and the "cockatiel side". Right across from the aviary is a state of the art kangaroo walkabout where guests can get up close and personal with the zoo's kangaroos and emus. Inside the kangaroo walkabout, there are several solar panel "trees" that were donated to the zoo by Florida Power & Light. The solar panels provide shade for the kangaroos, but their most important function is that they provide all the energy for the Komodo dragon house, where the Komodo dragons are located. Siamangs, a type of gibbon, are located in-between the entrances to the Africa and Lands of Change: Australia and Beyond.

Wild Florida
The exhibit includes North American river otters, American alligators, American crocodiles, bald eagles, foxes, crested caracaras, sandhill cranes, turtles, American black bears, white-tailed deer, wild turkeys, and bobcats. Feeding is demonstrated in this loop. There is also an area to kayak into the wetlands in the back. On May 1 2022, a trio of African lion brothers arrived at the zoo from the Naples Zoo. They are temporarily housed in the Florida loop until a permanent enclosure is built for them in Expedition Africa.

Rainforest Revealed (La Selva)
La Selva houses the zoo's black howler monkeys, jaguars, cotton-top tamarins, giant anteaters, golden-headed lion tamarins, black-handed spider monkeys, Chilean flamingos, macaws, tortoises, reptiles and fishes. This loop also feature's green iguanas, a Baird's tapir, a family of capybara, and a Linnaeus's two-toed sloth. In March 2007, a newly constructed vulture exhibit opened, which houses king vultures, turkey vultures and black vultures. Vulture feedings and demonstrations are offered to visitors much the same way they are conducted within the Wild Florida loop. The exhibit reopened under the new name, Rainforest Revealed.

Paws On
Paws On provides a place for children to play in a playground, a splash pad, and a petting zoo for children to explore.  The exhibit includes a shallow swimming area (splash pad); an aquarium mimicking the underwater environment of the nearby Indian River Lagoon with animals such as tarpons, stingrays, and black drums; a viewing tank with horseshoe crabs, hermit crabs, and Florida crown conchs; a pizzeria, and various other attractions aimed towards children of all ages. Exhibits from the old Paws On that were kept include the Soil Cube and the Whale Slide. The Barnyard (petting zoo) contains Nigerian dwarf goats, an African spurred tortoise, and chickens.  Other animals include eastern box turtles and dingos.

Caribbean Trail
Opened in November of 2013, the “Treasures of the Caribbean” trail is home to animals such as the Grand Cayman Blue Iguana and the Yellow-Naped Amazon. This exhibit also features a pirate-themed scavenger hunt.

Operations
The zoo received 363,426 visitors in 2011, up 5% from the previous year. This represented the second highest number of visitors on record.

Gallery

References

External links

 

Buildings and structures in Melbourne, Florida
1994 establishments in Florida
Protected areas of Brevard County, Florida
Tourist attractions in Brevard County, Florida
Zoos established in 1994
Zoos in Florida